-norpseudoephedrine, also known as cathine and (+)-norpseudoephedrine, is a psychoactive drug of the phenethylamine and amphetamine chemical classes which acts as a stimulant. Along with cathinone, it is found naturally in Catha edulis (khat), and contributes to its overall effects. It has approximately 7-10% the potency of amphetamine.

Pharmacology 

Like amphetamines, cathinone and ephedrine, cathine acts as a norepinephrine releasing agent (NRA). It also acts as a dopamine releasing agent (DRA).

Chemistry 

Cathine is one of the four stereoisomers of phenylpropanolamine (PPA).

Regulation 

The World Anti-Doping Agency's list of prohibited substances (used for the Olympic Games among other athletic events) bans cathine in concentrations of over 5 micrograms per milliliter in urine. Cathine is a Schedule III drug under the Convention on Psychotropic Substances. In the United States, it is classified as a Schedule IV controlled substance.

In Australia, Cathine is officially a schedule 4 drug prescription only, but is not available or approved for any medical use.

In Hong Kong, cathine is regulated under Schedule 1 of Hong Kong's Chapter 134 Dangerous Drugs Ordinance.  Unlawful possession is punishable by severe fines and imprisonment.

Pregnancy 
Ephedra, found in many Ephedraceae species, is a Chinese and Western herb that contains, among other amphetamines, -norpseudoephedrine. In the National Birth Defects Prevention Study, which included 18,438 women from 10 states from 1999 to 2003, 1.3% of women reported using ephedra during pregnancy. During the trial, five cases of anencephaly were born to women who used ephedra, however there was no statistically significant association to women not using ephedra (odds ratio 2.8, confidence interval 1.0–7.3).

A small study of 642 participants in Yemen found that among pregnant women who chewed khat (containing -norpseudoephedrine) there was no increased risk of stillbirth or congenital malformations. Among lactating women who chew khat, -norpseudoephedrine is found in breastmilk.

See also 
 -Norpseudoephedrine, the enantiomer
 Methcathinone
 Ephedra sinica ("Ephedra")
 Ephedrine
 Pseudoephedrine
 Methamphetamine

References 

Phenylethanolamines
Amphetamine alkaloids
Decongestants
Euphoriants
Norepinephrine-dopamine releasing agents